Sportsklubben Træff is a Norwegian sports club from Molde, Møre og Romsdal. It currently has sections for association football and team handball.

The men's football team currently plays in the Norwegian Second Division, the third tier of the Norwegian football league system, after being promoted from the 2021 Norwegian Third Division.

History
Træff had a longer stint in the 2. divisjon before being relegated after the 2002 season. Also, in 2000 they had survived play-offs with 3. divisjon teams to avoid relegation. Once situated in the 3. divisjon, Træff became a top team. In 2003 they won their 3. divisjon group, but in the two-leg playoff they lost to Volda TI on penalties after 3–3 on aggregate. In 2004 they won again and beat Skarbøvik IF 4–2 on aggregate in the playoff, but was relegated after the 2005 2. divisjon. In further playoffs, Træff lost to Skarbøvik in 2007 and to Aalesund 2 in 2009. In 2011, Træff was promoted to the 2. divisjon after they won their group. In 2015, the club was again relegated to the 3. divisjon.

Recent history 
{|class="wikitable"
|-bgcolor="#efefef"
! Season
! 
! Pos.
! Pl.
! W
! D
! L
! GS
! GA
! P
!Cup
!Notes
|-
|2009
|3. divisjon
|align=right |2
|align=right|22||align=right|16||align=right|3||align=right|3
|align=right|92||align=right|25||align=right|51
||First round
|
|-
|2010
|3. divisjon
|align=right |2
|align=right|22||align=right|15||align=right|4||align=right|3
|align=right|74||align=right|19||align=right|49
||First round
|
|-
|2011
|3. divisjon
|align=right bgcolor=#DDFFDD| 1
|align=right|26||align=right|17||align=right|2||align=right|7
|align=right|86||align=right|28||align=right|53
||Second round
|Promoted
|-
|2012 
|2. divisjon
|align=right |9
|align=right|26||align=right|8||align=right|8||align=right|10
|align=right|51||align=right|50||align=right|32
||Second round
|
|-
|2013
|2. divisjon
|align=right |4
|align=right|26||align=right|13||align=right|3||align=right|10
|align=right|45||align=right|46||align=right|42
||Second round 
|
|-
|2014
|2. divisjon
|align=right |10
|align=right|26||align=right|7||align=right|7||align=right|12
|align=right|36||align=right|43||align=right|28
||Second round
|
|-
|2015
|2. divisjon
|align=right bgcolor="#FFCCCC"| 13
|align=right|26||align=right|5||align=right|5||align=right|16
|align=right|27||align=right|63||align=right|20
||Second round
|Relegated
|-
|2016
|3. divisjon
|align=right| 3
|align=right|26||align=right|16||align=right|2||align=right|8
|align=right|53||align=right|33||align=right|50
||Second qual. round
|
|-
|2017
|3. divisjon
|align=right| 9
|align=right|26||align=right|10||align=right|6||align=right|10
|align=right|45||align=right|48||align=right|36
||First round
|
|-
|2018
|3. divisjon
|align=right| 2
|align=right|26||align=right|15||align=right|8||align=right|3
|align=right|65||align=right|37||align=right|53
||First round
|
|-
|2019
|3. divisjon
|align=right| 10
|align=right|26||align=right|8||align=right|5||align=right|13
|align=right|33||align=right|47||align=right|29
||First round
|
|-
|2020
|colspan="11"|Season cancelled
|-
|2021
|3. divisjon
|align=right bgcolor=#DDFFDD| 1
|align=right|13||align=right|10||align=right|1||align=right|2
|align=right|41||align=right|20||align=right|31
|First round
|Promoted
|-
|2022
|2. divisjon
|align=right |6
|align=right|26||align=right|10||align=right|6||align=right|10
|align=right|49||align=right|44||align=right|36
|First round
|
|}
Source:

References

External links
 Official site 
 Reknesbanen - Nordic Stadiums

Football clubs in Norway
Sport in Molde
Association football clubs established in 1924
1924 establishments in Norway